Charter boles are indentations found in the boundary walls of Scottish buildings constructed between the 15th and 17th centuries; they were used to denote ownership and responsibility for repair. They are similar to bee boles but smaller in size.

"in Scotland a single charter bole, one foot square or less, was often built into a wall to indicate its ownership".

"charter bole: a rectangular recess used to house charter documents defining ownership of adjoining properties."

It shows that the "wall belongs to the property on this side of it".

References

External links 
 http://www.saint-andrews.info/bee%20boles.html
 https://web.archive.org/web/20121209012610/http://www.trp.dundee.ac.uk/research/glossary/bee-bole.html

Architectural elements
Renaissance architecture in Scotland